Pseudogaurotina abdominalis is a species of the Lepturinae subfamily in the long-horned beetle family. This beetle is distributed in United States, and the Canada.

References

Lepturinae
Beetles described in 1862